The Maltatal is a valley in the High Tauern mountain range of the Central Eastern Alps. It follows the course of the Malta river down towards its confluence with the Lieser, itself a left tributary of the Drava. Most of the area belongs to the municipality of Malta in Carinthia, Austria.

The upper Maltatal ends at the Kölnbrein Dam east of the Ankogel Group, from where the Malta stream flows southeastwards about  down along the mountains of the Reisseck Group to Gmünd and into the Lieser river. The valley is known for its many waterfalls during snowmelt season, therefore also called the 'Valley of Falling Waters'.

After the Austrian Anschluss to Nazi Germany, beginning in 1941 the Malta Valley was the site of a labour camp where deported prisoners of war originating from the Soviet Union were forced to work in a granite quarry supplying a Reichsautobahn construction site in nearby Spittal an der Drau (the present-day Tauern Autobahn). At least 21 inmates died from the inhuman working conditions; a memorial marks their burial place at a nearby chapel.

See also
Fallbach Waterfall

Valleys of the Alps
Valleys of Carinthia (state)